The 2017 Ball Hockey World Championship will be the 12th ball hockey world championship, and will be held in Pardubice, Czech Republic. The tournament began on 1 June 2017, and the gold medal game was played on 10 June 2017. Slovakia entered the tournament as the defending champions. The Canadian women's national ball hockey team with the bronze medal in women's play, while the United States qualified for the gold medal game for the first time in tournament history.

Venue

Participants

Division A
Group A
 Canada
 Finland
 Greece
 India
 Slovakia
Group B
 Czech Republic
 Italy
 Portugal
 Switzerland
 USA

Division B
Group C
 Bermuda
 France
 Great Britain
 Lebanon
Group D
 Armenia
 Cayman Islands
 Haiti
 Hong Kong

Preliminary round
The schedule was announced on 20 January 2017.

Division A
Group A

Group B

Division B
Group A

Group B

Awards and honors

Women’s tournament
Most Valuable Player: Kateřina Zechovská, Czech Republic
Leading Scorer: Jamie Lee Rattray, Canada
Best goalkeeper: Zuzana Tomčíková, Slovakia
Best defenseman: Kristen Cooze, Canada
Best forward: Denisa Křížová,  Czech Republic
Tournament All-stars:
Rachel Jackson (Great Britain)
Veronika Volkova (Czech Republic)
Stephanie Caban (USA)
Taylor Stedman (USA)
Lucie Manhartová (Czech Republic)
Alicia Furletti Blomberg (Italia)
Fair-play award: Team Great Britain

References

External links
Official website

Ball Hockey World Championship
Ball Hockey World Championship
Ball Hockey World Championship